William Oliver Jackson  was an Anglican priest in Ireland during the second half of the 19th century and the first decade of the 20th.

Jackson was born in County Mayo and  educated at Trinity College Dublin. He was ordained in 1847.  He became the incumbent of Killala in 1871; the Archdeacon of Killala in 1874; and Rural Dean in 1883. He died in 1903.

Notes

Alumni of Trinity College Dublin
Church of Ireland priests
19th-century Irish Anglican priests
Archdeacons of Killala
Religious leaders from County Mayo
1903 deaths